Hripsime (died c. 290), also called Rhipsime, Ripsime, Ripsima, Ripsimia, Ripsimus, Arbsima or Arsema was a martyr of Roman origin; she and her companions in martyrdom are venerated as some of the first Christian martyrs of Armenia.

Biography
According to legend, Hripsime was possibly of noble birth. She belonged to a community of virgins in Rome, numbering 35 under the leadership of Gayane. She was known to be extremely beautiful, and attracted the notice of Diocletian. To avoid his advances she, along with her community, fled the city, going first to Alexandria before settling in Vagharshapat. The varying accounts of her martyrdom diverge at this point. One story indicates that Hripsime again was noticed for her beauty, this time by King Tiridates III, who proceeded to pursue her. Upon being brought before him, she refused his advances and was punished by being roasted alive. Gayane was then put to death by Tiridates' soldiers, as were all the members of her community except for Nune (or Marine), who was later a missionary in Georgia and, as Saint Nino, is praised as the founder of the Georgian Orthodox Church.

Another version of the saint's Acts indicates that, upon discovering Hripsime's whereabouts, Diocletian sent a letter to Tiridates insisting that he either send her back or take her for himself. The king's servants found her among her companions, here described as nuns, and urged that she follow his wishes. She responded that she could not marry as she was betrothed to Jesus Christ, as were the others. At this, a voice from heaven was heard, saying, "Be brave and fear not, for I am with you". Upon this, Tiridates ordered that Hripsime be tortured; her tongue was cut out, her stomach cut open, and she was blinded before being killed. Her body was then cut into pieces. Inspired by her example, Gayane and two other nuns gave themselves over to similar treatment before being beheaded. The rest of the community was put to the sword, their bodies thrown to the beasts to be eaten. Supposedly, Tiridates and his soldiers were then punished by God for their actions; the soldiers were beset by devils, and began to act like wild animals, running through the forests, gnawing at themselves, and tearing their clothes. The legend states that the King was turned into a wild boar for his actions, and had to be saved by the intervention of Gregory the Illuminator. These accounts are likely highly fictionalized; about the only thing certain about Hripsime's story is that she and her companions were, in fact, martyred in Armenia in about 290.

St. Hripsime Church, Echmiadzin

St. Hripsime Church in Echmiadzin is dedicated to Hripsime; the current structure was consecrated in 618, and contains her tomb in the catacombs beneath the building. According to legend, Christ designated the spot for the shrine by descending from heaven in a shaft of light and smiting the ground with a golden hammer until the earth shook. Some of the saint's relics, along with items relating to Tiridates and Gregory the Illuminator, were pillaged by Persians during an invasion in 1604, but were restored in 1638.

Feast
In the Catholic tradition, Hripsime and her companions are commemorated with a feast day of 29 September; the Orthodox Church in America commemorates them on 30 September. The Armenian Apostolic Church remembers Hripsime and her companions on 4 June; Gayane and her companions are commemorated separately, on 5 June.

Veneration in Ethiopia
Saint Hripsime is one of the most venerated saints in Ethiopia. She is known as "Arsema" (አርሴማ) to Ethiopian Orthodox Christians. Currently there are three well known churches and monasteries named after her in Ethiopia. Among the churches, the oldest one, is found in one of the Lake Tana islands. There are many old icons in the church portraying how she was martyred by Tiridates III (Dirtadis in Ethiopian languages) and how the cruel king was changed into a beast after killing her. There is annual pilgrimage by Ethiopian Christians to this church in January. There are also Christian songs praising her faith and martyrdom. The book entitled Gedle Arsema, meaning "The Life of Arsema", is found almost in every spiritual bookshop throughout Ethiopia. Her story is told in the Ethiopian Synaxarium on Mäskäräm 29 (which equates to 26 or 27 September on the Julian Calendar, and 9 or 10 October on the Gregorian Calendar) which coincides with the date of the saint's martyrdom.

Legacy
In honour of the saint, Hripsime remains a fairly common female name in Armenia, as do its variants; likewise, Arsema is a very popular name among Ethiopian and Eritrean Christians.

Notes and references

External links
Saints.sqpn: Rhipsime

Year of birth unknown
290s deaths
 Christians martyred during the reign of Diocletian
Year of death uncertain
3rd-century Christian martyrs
Italian saints
Saints from Roman Italy
Burials at Saint Hripsime Church
Ante-Nicene Christian female saints
3rd-century Romans
3rd-century Roman women
Ancient Roman saints
3rd century in Armenia